The discography of American rapper Kool G Rap consists of 9 studio albums, two collaborative albums, one EP, and thirty singles.

Albums

Studio albums

Compilation albums

Extended plays

Mixtapes

Singles

As lead artist

As featured artist

Guest appearances

Music videos

As lead artist

As featured artist

References

Discography
Hip hop discographies
Discographies of American artists